Duck and Cover is the second full-length album from the Mad Caddies.  It was released in 1998 by Fat Wreck Chords.

Track listing
 "Road Rash" – 2:01
 "The Gentleman" – 2:15
 "No Hope" – 1:26
 "One Shot" – 4:52
 "Macho Nachos" – 3:17
 "Monkeys" – 2:45
 "Econoline" – 2:14
 "The Joust" – 3:46
 "Betty" – 3:21
 "aPathetic" – 2:14
 "Medium Unwell" – 3:03
 "Popcorn" – 3:53

References

Mad Caddies albums
1998 albums
Fat Wreck Chords albums